is a Japanese former professional football player. He was capped by the Japan national team.

Club career
In 2019, Masuda joined the K League 2 side Seoul E-Land on loan from Shimizu S-Pulse. He announced his retirement in November of the same year.

International career
Masuda made his senior national team debut on 24 February 2012 in a friendly match against Iceland.

Club statistics
Last update: 6 January 2018

National team statistics

References

External links 
 
 Japan National Football Team Database
 
 Profile at Shimizu S-Pulse
 
	

1985 births
Living people
Association football people from Miyazaki Prefecture
Japanese footballers
Association football midfielders
Japan international footballers
J1 League players
K League 1 players
K League 2 players
UAE Pro League players
Kashima Antlers players
Montedio Yamagata players
Ulsan Hyundai FC players
Omiya Ardija players
Sharjah FC players
Shimizu S-Pulse players
Seoul E-Land FC players
Footballers at the 2006 Asian Games
Japanese expatriate footballers
Expatriate footballers in South Korea
Japanese expatriate sportspeople in South Korea
Asian Games competitors for Japan